This is a list of notable residents and people who have origins in the Padma Division region of Bangladesh; consisting of the districts of Faridpur, Rajbari, Madaripur, Gopalgonj and Shariatpur. This list also includes British Bangladeshis, Bangladeshi Americans, Bangladeshi Canadians, and other non-resident Bengalis who have origins in Greater Faridpur. The people may also be known as Faridpuri.

Activism and cause célèbres 
 Abala Bose, social worker
 Chittapriya Ray Chaudhuri, revolutionary
 Chittaranjan Das, freedom fighter, political activist and lawyer 
 Durga Mohan Das, social reformer for women rights
 Dwarkanath Ganguly, women's rights social reformer
 Jyotirmayee Gangopadhyay, feminist and educationist
 Harichand Thakur, social worker for untouchable castes
 Manoranjan Bhattacharya, Indian independence activist
 Panchanan Chakraborty, Indian independence activist
 Pulin Behari Das, revolutionary and founder of the Dhaka Anushilan Samiti
 Sayera Khatun, housewife and mother of Sheikh Mujibur Rahman
 Siraj Sikder, revolutionary
 Sheikh Fazilatunnesa Mujib, wife of Sheikh Mujibur Rahman 
 Sheikh Russel, son of Sheikh Mujibur Rahman 
 Ruby Ghaznavi, handicraft revivalist

Art and design 
 Bijan Choudhury, painter
 Faruque Alam, civil engineer, wood technologist and former chairman of Bangladesh Inland Water Transport Corporation
 Fazlur Rahman Khan, architect that is dubbed the Einstein of Structural Engineering
 Himanish Goswami, cartoonist
 Jogen Chowdhury, painter
 Kalidas Karmakar, artist and specialist of viscosity printing
 Kazi Anowar Hossain, painter
 Monsur Ul Karim, painter
 Sarbari Roy Choudhury, artist
 Shamim Sikder, sculptor

Business and industry 
 Chowdhury Moyezuddin Biwshash, zamindar and merchant
 Fakhruddin Ahmed, former governor of the Bangladesh Bank
 Kazi Zafarullah, industrialist and politician
 Khuda Buksh, life insurance salesman and humanitarian
 Parveen Haque Sikder, director of National Bank Limited
 Sheikh Fazle Fahim, global trade leader
 Wahiduzzaman, director of the State Bank of Pakistan and founder of Zaman Industrial Corporation

Education and sciences 
 Abdullah Baqui, public health scientist
 Amalendu De, professor of history at Jadavpur University
 Farzana Islam, vice-chancellor of Jahangirnagar University
 Gopal Chandra Bhattacharya, entomologist and naturalist
 Jagadish Chandra Bose, inventor of the crescograph and father of radio science and Bengali science fiction. A moon crater is named after him.
 Kadambini Ganguly, first Indian female practitioner of western medicine
 Kamrun Nesa Nilu, physician and health advisor to the Government of Bangladesh
 Kazi Shahidullah, former vice-chancellor at the National University, Bangladesh
 Maqsudul Alam, life scientist best known for genome sequencing
 Mokarram Hussain Khundker, professor of chemistry at Dhaka University and a founder of the Bangladesh Academy of Sciences 
 Nawab Abdul Latif, educator and social worker
 Prasanta Chandra Mahalanobis, anthropometrist, statistician and introducer of the Mahalanobis distance
 Qazi Abu Yusuf, physician and politician
 Qazi Motahar Hossain, scientist, author and teacher
 R. C. Majumdar, history professor and former Sheriff of Kolkata
 Sarala Roy, educationist
 Shariff Enamul Kabir, former vice-chancellor of Jahangirnagar University
 Sufia Ahmed, first female National Professor
 Zohra Begum Kazi, first female physician of Bengal

Entertainment 
 Bijon Bhattacharya, theatre and film actor
 Kazi Abdul Wadud, dramatist
 Mohammad Asaduzzaman, chairman of the University Grants Commission
 Mrinal Sen, filmmaker
 Nargis Akhter, film director, screenwriter and producer
 Nurul Momen, pioneer of Bengali drama
 Phani Majumdar, Indian film director
 Premankur Atorthy, filmmaker, novelist and journalist
 Riaz, Bangladeshi film actor
 Rubaiyat Hossain, film director
 Shakib Khan, Dhallywood film actor
 Tareque Masud, film director, producer and screenwriter

Music 
 Firoza Begum, Nazrul Geeti singer
 Fakir Alamgir, folk and pop singer
 Geeta Dutt, singer
 Sagar Sen, Rabindra Sangeet singer

Families 
 Nawabs of Padamdi, descended from Syed Shah Pahlwan
 Sheikh–Wazed family, political dynasty descended from Sheikh Awwal
 Zamindars of Haturia, descended from Shaykh Muhammad Ashuq Mridha

Legal and police 
 A. B. M. Khairul Haque, 19th Chief Justice of Bangladesh
 A. K. M. Shahidul Haque, 27th Inspector General of Bangladesh Police
 Asmat Ali Khan, advocate and social worker
 Golam Wahed Choudhury, political scientist and diplomat
 Habibur Rahman, Deputy Inspector General of Bangladesh Police
 KM Sobhan, justice, diplomat and activist
 M. Azizul Haq, former inspector-general of Bangladesh Police
 Mosharraf Hossain, lawyer and politician
 Muhammad Ibrahim, judge and 8th vice-chancellor of Dhaka University
 Noor-E-Alam Chowdhury Liton, chief whip of Jatiya Sangsad
 Satish Ranjan Das, lawyer and former Advocate-General of Bengal
 Sheikh Lutfar Rahman, civil court record-keeping officer
 Sigma Huda, human rights activist, lawyer and United Nations special rapporteur
 Sudhi Ranjan Das, fifth Chief Justice of India

Literature and journalism 

 Abu Ishaque, novelist
 Abul Hasan, poet and journalist
 Ajit Kumar Chakravarty, litterateur and translator 
 Alaol, medieval Bengali poet
 ANM Bazlur Rashid, litterateur and educationist
 A. Q. M. Jainul Abedin, journalist
 Atul Prasad Sen, educationist, lyricist and litterateur 
 Gautam Das, print journalist and bureau chief for Samakal
 Habibullah Siraji, poet
 Humayun Kabir, educationist, politician and philosopher. 
 Jasimuddin, poet and folklorist
 Mir Mosharraf Hossain, novelist, playwright and essayist
 Mohammad A. Quayum, editor, critic and translator
 Narendranath Mitra, short-story writer
 Nassakh, Urdu poet, literary critic and magistrate
 Ram Thakur, Hindu journalist
 Rowshan Ali Chowdhury, journalist, writer, poet and politician
 Sufi Motahar Hossein, poet
 Sukanta Bhattacharya, poet and playwright
 Sunil Gangopadhyay,  poet and novelist
 Yakub Ali Chowdhury, essayist and journalist

Military 
 Abu Mayeen Ashfakus Samad, former Bangladesh Army officer
 ATM Amin, former general of the Bangladesh Army
 Mohabbat Jan Chowdhury, former major general of the Bangladesh Army
 Atiqur Rahman, Bangladesh's 4th Chief of Army Staff
 Khondkar Nazmul Huda, war veteran
 Mohammad Nizamuddin Ahmed, former Chief of Bangladeshi Naval Staff
 Munshi Abdur Rouf, military officer
 Mustafizur Rahman, Bangladesh's 8th Chief of Army Staff
 Shafiqur Rahman, former Chief of General Staff (Bangladesh Army)
 Sheikh Fazlul Haque Mani, founder of the Mujib Bahini and the Jubo League
 Sheikh Jamal, former lieutenant of the Bangladesh Army
 Suranjan Das, Indian pilot
 Syed Mir Ali Imam Al Mamun, former Bangladesh Army officer

Politics and government

Bangladesh 
 Abul Hasanat Abdullah, MP for Barisal-1
 Abul Kalam Azad, Jamaat-e-Islami politician
 Abul Khair Chowdhury, former MP of Madaripur-1
 Abdul Quader Molla, Jamaat-e-Islami politician
 Abdur Rab Serniabat, former Minister of Water Resources
 Abdur Razzaq, former Minister of Water Resources
 Abdus Sobhan Golap, MP for Madaripur-3
 Abidur Reza Khan, former MP for Faridpur-18
 AFM Bahauddin Nasim, former MP for Madaripur-3
 Akhteruzzaman Babul, politician for Jatiya Party (Ershad)
 Akkas Ali Miah, former MP for Rajbari-1
 AKM Aszad, politician
 AKM Enamul Haque Shamim, MP for Shariatpur-2 and Deputy Minister of Water Resources
 Ali Ahsan Mohammad Mojaheed, former secretary-general of Bangladesh Jamaat-e-Islami
 Ali Newaz Mahmud Khaiyam, former MP
 B. M. Muzammel Haque, former MP for Shariatpur-1
 Chowdhury Akmal Ibne Yusuf, former Bangladesh Nationalist Party politician
 Chowdhury Kamal Ibne Yusuf, former Minister of Food
 Farid Ahmed, former independent MP of Gopalganj-2
 Faruk Khan, former Minister of Civil Aviation and Tourism
 Ganesh Chandra Haldar, former MP for Madaripur-3
 Helen Zerin Khan, member of the Jatiya Sangsad Reserved Seats
 Iqbal Hossain Apu, MP for Shariatpur-2
 Ilias Ahmed Chowdhury, former MP of Madaripur-1
 Jahanara Begum, politician
 Kazi Abdur Rashid, former MP of Gopalganj-1
 Kazi Keramat Ali, former Minister for Technical and Madrasa Education
 Khandaker Mosharraf Hossain, former Minister of Local Government, Rural Development and Co-operatives
 K.M. Hemayet Ullah Auranga, former MP for Shariatpur-1
 KM Obaidur Rahman, former politician for Awami League
 Lutfar Rahman Farooq, politician
 Master Majibur Rahman, former MP for Shariatpur-1
 Md. Abdul Wajed Chowdhury, politician
 Md. Zillul Hakim, former MP for Rajbari-2
 M. H. Khan Monjur, former MP of Gopalganj-1
 Mujibur Rahman Chowdhury, MP for Faridpur-4
 Naheed Ezaher Khan, member of the Jatiya Sangsad Reserved Seats
 Nahim Razzaq, MP for Shariatpur-3
 Nasirul Haque Sabu, former MP for Rajbari-2
 Nilufer Zafarullah, member of the Jatiya Sangsad Reserved Seats
 Phani Bhushan Majumder, former Minister of Information
 Qazi Mahabub Ahmed, former MP for Madaripur-2
 Rushema Begum, member of the Jatiya Sangsad Reserved Seats
 Salma Chowdhury, MP
 Sardar AKM Nasiruddin, former MP for Shariatpur-1
 Sarwar Jahan Mia, former MNA politician
 Sarwar Jan Chowdhury, former MP of Gopalganj-1
 Serniabat Sadiq Abdullah, the Mayor of Barisal
 Shajahan Khan, former Bangladeshi Minister of Shipping
 Sharfuzzaman Jahangir, former MP of Gopalganj-1
 Shawkat Ali, deputy speaker of the Jatiya Sangsad
 Sheikh Abu Naser, former MP
 Sheikh Fazle Noor Taposh, 2nd Mayor of South Dhaka
 Sheikh Hasina, 10th Prime Minister of Bangladesh
 Sheikh Helal Uddin, Awami League politician
 Sheikh Md Abdullah, former Minister of Religious Affairs
 Sheikh Mujibur Rahman, first President of Bangladesh
 Sheikh Rehana, politician
 Sheikh Salahuddin Jewel, MP for Khulna-2
 Sheikh Selim, member of the Awami League standing committee
 Sheikh Shahidul Islam, secretary general of the Jatiya Party (Manju)
 Sheikh Tonmoy, MP for Bagerhat-2
 Sirajul Islam Bhuiyan, former MP for Madaripur-2
 Syed Abul Hossain, Awami League politician
 Syeda Sajeda Chowdhury, deputy leader of the Jatiya Sangsad
 T. M. Giasuddin Ahmed, former MP for Shariatpur-2

Other 
Ambica Charan Mazumdar, former president of the Indian National Congress
Buddhadeb Bhattacharjee, former Chief Minister of West Bengal
Chowdhury Abd-Allah Zaheeruddin, former Minister of Health, Labour and Social Welfare for Pakistan
Farida Anwar, Labour Party politician in the United Kingdom
Fayakuzzaman, member of the 3rd National Assembly of Pakistan
Kedar Ray, 16th-century Baro-Bhuiyan chieftain and zamindar
Maulvi Tamizuddin Khan, former Speaker of the Constituent Assembly of Pakistan
Sudha Roy, Indian communist trade unionist
Yusuf Ali Chowdhury, Muslim League politician

Religion and spirituality 

 Abdul Haque Faridi, educator and author
 Dudu Miyan, 2nd leader of the Faraizi Movement
 Haji Shariatullah, anti-British revolutionary, founder of the Faraizi Movement
 Shamsul Haque Faridpuri, educationist and social reformer

Sports 
 Aminul Islam, all-rounder cricketer
 Gostha Pal, footballer and first captain of the India national team
 Mabia Akhter, weightlifter
 Sheikh Kamal, founder of Abahani and aide-de-camp of Mukti Bahini
 Shohely Akhter, cricketer

References

External links

Greater Faridpur
Greater Faridpur